A mixing paddle is a shaped device, typically mounted on a shaft, which can be inserted on the shaft end into a motorised drive, for the purpose of mixing liquids, solids or both.
Paddle mixers may also be used for kneading.
Whilst mounted in fixed blending equipment, the paddle may also be referred to as an agitator.

Purpose
Mixing paddles are used for mixing ingredients in cooking and for mixing construction products, such as pastes, slurries or paints.
They are also used for dispersing solids within liquids (for example, some polymers may be delivered in solid form, but will dissolve in liquids).

Examples
Professional grout mixing paddle
Paint mixing paddle
Mudwhip (mostly used for drywall mud)

Gallery

See also 

 Concrete mixer

References

External links

The Free Dictionary
Merriam Webster Definition of Paddle

Food preparation utensils